Don Cassel (born April 4, 1942) is the author/coauthor of 60 US/Canadian college textbooks and was a Humber College professor for 30 years, responsible for developing the college's first Computer Programming curriculum.

Career 

Cassel was a Professor of Information Technology at Humber College in Toronto, Ontario from 1968 to 1998.  In 1968, after arriving at Humber from IBM, he developed the college's first Computer Programming program, which is still part of the curriculum. During this time he specialized in computer programming and application software courses. He was a founding member of the Information Systems department in 1968 where he was department head for 10 years.

During his tenure at Humber Cassel developed numerous courses and was active in curriculum development for the School of Business and later for the School of Information Technology. He developed one of the first online interactive courses at Humber for Microsoft Access using WebCT. WebCT became a significant tool for developing and delivering distance learning for the college.

Cassel was a computer programmer and system analyst with IBM Canada from 1961 to 1968. He received an undergraduate degree in Computer Science from York University in 1975 and was accepted into the Ontario Institute for Studies in Education at the University of Toronto for a Master of Education program, completing the first year of the two-year program. At this point writing college textbooks began to require his full attention.

In 1972 his first book, Programming Language One, was published by Reston Publishing Company of Reston, Virginia, a subsidiary of Prentice Hall Inc.  Thus began a long period of textbook writing for college programs across North America.

Publications 

 Canadian Internet Handbook - Educational Edition, Prentice Hall Canada, 1999, coauthored with Jim Carroll and Rick Broadhead.
 Surfing for Success in Business and Economics. Prentice Hall Canada, 1999 coauthored with Andrew T. Stull
 Canadian Internet Handbook - Educational Edition, Prentice Hall Canada, 1998, coauthored with Jim Carroll and Rick Broadhead.
 Internet Handbook - U.S. Edition, Prentice Hall Canada, 1997, coauthored with Jim Carroll and Rick Broadhead.
 Canadian Internet Handbook - Educational Edition, Prentice Hall Canada, 1997, coauthored with Jim Carroll and Rick Broadhead.
 Computing Essentials - Introducing Visual Basic 4 for Windows 95, Prentice Hall, Inc. 1996
 Computing Essentials - Introducing Microsoft Access for Windows 95, Prentice Hall, Inc. 1996
 Computing Essentials - Introducing Microsoft Excel for Windows 95, Prentice Hall, Inc. 1996
 Computing Essentials - Introducing Microsoft Word for Windows 95, Prentice Hall, Inc. 1996
 Computing Essentials - Introducing Windows 95, Prentice Hall, Inc. 1996
 Canadian Internet Handbook - Educational Edition, Prentice Hall Canada, 1995, coauthored with Jim Carroll and Rick Broadhead.	
 Source 1 - Computing Essentials, Microsoft Excel 5, Prentice Hall, Inc 1995.
 Source 1 - Computing Essentials, Microsoft Word 6, Prentice Hall, Inc 1995.
 Source 1 - Computing Essentials, QBASIC, Prentice Hall, Inc 1995, coauthored with Sherry Newell.
 Source 1 - Computing Essentials, DOS 6, Prentice Hall, Inc 1995.
 Source 1 - Computing Essentials, Microsoft Excel 4.0, Prentice Hall, Inc. 1993, coauthored with Sherry Newell.
 Source 1 - Computing Essentials, dBASE IV Release 1.1, Prentice Hall, Inc. 1993
 Source 1 - Computing Essentials, dBASE III Plus, Prentice Hall, Inc. 1993
 Source 1 - Computing Essentials, Quattro Pro 3.0, Prentice Hall, Inc. 1993
 Source 1 - Computing Essentials, Quattro 1.01, Prentice Hall, Inc. 1993
 Source 1 - Computing Essentials, Lotus 1-2-3 Release 2.3, Prentice Hall, Inc. 1993
 Source 1 - Computing Essentials, Lotus 1-2-3 Release 2.2, Prentice Hall, Inc. 1993
 Source 1 - Computing Essentials, WordPerfect 5.1, Prentice Hall, Inc. 1993
 Source 1 - Computing Essentials, WordPerfect 4.2, Prentice Hall, Inc. 1993
 Source 1 - Computing Essentials, PC DOS/MS-DOS, Prentice Hall, Inc. 1993
 Source 1 - Computing Essentials, DOS 5.0, Prentice Hall, Inc. 1993
 Using DOS, WordPerfect 5.1, Lotus 1-2-3 Release 2.2, and dBASE III Plus, Prentice Hall Inc. 1992.
 Learning Lotus 1-2-3 Releases 2.3 and 2.4, Prentice Hall Canada, Inc. 1992.
 Learning Lotus 1-2-3 Release 2.2, Prentice Hall Canada, Inc. 1991.
 Understanding Computers, Prentice Hall, Inc. 1990
 Learning DOS, WordPerfect 5.0, Lotus 1-2-3 2.2, dBASE III Plus Prentice Hall Inc. 1990
 Learning DOS, WordPerfect 4.2, Lotus 1-2-3/TWIN , dBASE III Plus Prentice Hall Inc. 1990
 Advanced Structured COBOL and Program Design, International Edition, Prentice-Hall Inc. 1987
 Advanced Structured COBOL and Program Design, Prentice-Hall Inc. 1987
 Introduction to Structured COBOL and Program Design, Prentice-Hall Inc. 1987
 WATCOM BASIC Made Easy, Prentice-Hall Canada, 1986
 WordStar 3.3 Simplified, Prentice-Hall Inc., 1984
 Lotus 1,2,3 Simplified for the IBM Personal Computer, Prentice-Hall Inc., 1985–86
 dBASE II Simplified for the IBM Personal Computer, Prentice-Hall Inc., 1985
 BASIC and Problem Solving Made Easy, Reston, 1985
 BASIC Programming for the Commodore PLUS/4 and Commodore 16 Wm. C. Brown, 1985
 Commodore 64 Graphics, Sound and Music, Wm.C. Brown, 1985
 Introduction to Computers and Information Processing - 2nd Edition, Reston 1985 - with Martin Jackson
 BASIC Made Easy 2nd Edition, Reston, 1985 - coauthored with Richard Swanson
 EasyWriter Simplified for the IBM Personal Computer, Prentice-Hall Inc., 1984
 WordStar Simplified for the IBM Personal Computer, Prentice-Hall Inc., 1984
 Computers Made Easy, Reston, 1984
 BASIC Programming for the Commodore 64, Wm.C. Brown, 1984
 BASIC Programming for the Commodore VIC-20, Wm.C. Brown, 1984
 BASIC 4.0 Programming for the PET/CBM, Wm.C. Brown, 1983
 FORTRAN Made Easy, Reston, 1983 - coauthored with Richard Swanson
 An Introduction to Microcomputers - Audio/Visual Presentation, Prentice-Hall Media, 1983
 The Structured Alternative: An Introduction to Program Design, Coding, Style, Debugging and Testing, Reston, 1983
 Introduction to Computers and Information Processing - BASIC, COBOL, FORTRAN, Pascal, Reston 1981 - coauthored with Martin Jackson
 Introduction to Computers and Information Processing - Language Free Edition, Reston 1981 - coauthored with Martin Jackson
 BASIC Made Easy, Reston, 1980 - coauthored with Richard Swanson
 Introduction to Computers and Information Processing, Reston, 1980 - coauthored with Martin Jackson
 PL/I: A Structured Approach, Reston, 1978
 BASIC Programming in Real Time, Reston, 1975
 Programming Language One, Reston, 1972

References

External links 
 Don Cassel website
 Don Cassel personal website

Canadian textbook writers
IBM employees
Living people
Academic staff of Humber College
1942 births